Pedro Espinel Torres (August 1, 1908 – November 8, 1981 in Lima) was a Peruvian composer. He is best known for his piece El Rey de las Polkas.

1908 births
1981 deaths
Peruvian composers
Peruvian male composers
20th-century composers
20th-century male musicians